Ignacio Galindo may refer to:

Ignacio Galindo, Spanish colonial governor and municipal president of Monterrey in 1857
Ignacio Galindo, Spanish football club manager with (as of 2016) Tomelloso CF

See also
Nacho Galindo (disambiguation)